Antonio de Guill y Gonzaga (died August 24, 1768) was a Spanish colonial administrator who served as Royal Governor of Panama and Royal Governor of Chile.

Arauco War
Governor Guill y Gonzaga celebrated the "Parliament of Nacimiento" with the Mapuches in 1764, where he tried to impose his scheme to make them live in towns.  This provoked the Mapuche uprising of 1766 under the command of the toqui Curiñancu, which lasted until Agustín de Jáuregui made a peace in 1774.

In addition he was ordered to carry out the expulsion of the Jesuits on August 27, 1767, from Chile.

During his government, he declared Talcahuano as a “Port of registry". In 1765 he founded the Villa San Luis Gonzaga de Rere and Tucapel Nuevo, the following year San Carlos de Yumbel was founded, all of them in the region of Concepcion. On Chiloé, San Carlos de Chonchi was founded in 1767 and San Carlos de Ancud in 1768.

He died in Santiago on August 24, 1768.  He was succeeded by Juan de Balmaseda y Censano Beltrán as the interim governor.

See also
Arauco War
Suppression of the Society of Jesus
Manuel de Montiano

Notes

Sources

1768 deaths
Royal Governors of Panama
Royal Governors of Chile
18th-century Spanish people
Year of birth unknown